Jozef Edward Blochel (born 3 March 1962) in Chalfont St Giles, Buckinghamshire, is an English retired professional footballer who played as a winger for Wimbledon in the Football League.

Blochel joined Southampton as an associate schoolboy in September 1975, signing as a professional in March 1980, but failed to break into the first-team. He joined Wimbledon on loan in January 1982, before being released by "the Saints".

After a few years in Scandinavia, he returned to England to play lower league football, before settling in Scandinavia.

References

1962 births
Living people
People from Chalfont St Giles
English footballers
Association football forwards
Southampton F.C. players
Wimbledon F.C. players
IK Arvika players
Road-Sea Southampton F.C. players
Karlstad BK players
Wycombe Wanderers F.C. players
Bognor Regis Town F.C. players
SK Djerv 1919 players
English Football League players
Expatriate footballers in Sweden
Expatriate footballers in Norway
English expatriate sportspeople in Sweden
English expatriate sportspeople in Norway